Blam or BLAM may refer to:

People 
 Baz Luhrmann (born 1968), Australian film director, screenwriter and producer, who uses the producer credit BLAM
 Edmund Blampied (1886–1966), Jersey artist

Music 
 Blam! (album), a 1978 album by the Brothers Johnson
 Blam!, a 2010 album by Jme

 Barenaked Ladies Are Me, an album by the Barenaked Ladies

Other uses 
 Blam (Roy Lichtenstein), painting by Roy Lichtenstein
 Blam!, a series of TV shorts part of Disney's Have a Laugh!